Fritz Roeber (15 October 1851, Elberfeld – 15 May 1924, Düsseldorf) was a German illustrator, lithographer and history painter, associated with the Düsseldorfer Malerschule. As Director of the Kunstakademie Düsseldorf, he carried out some significant organizational changes.

Biography
His father was the writer , who also served as the Procurator for Elberfeld. After completing his primary education, he studied painting at a private school operated by Eduard Bendemann. His studies were interrupted by service in the Franco-Prussian War then, in the mid-1870s, he presented some large lithographs on Biblical themes. 

He accepted a major commission from Rhine Province to design figurative jewelry for a gold trophy, to be presented to Prince (later Kaiser) Wilhelm on the occasion of his wedding. Later, he became a co-founder of the "Central-Gewerbe-Vereins" (Central Trade Association) and helped to develop the local arts and crafts industry. From 1893, he was an instructor at the Kunstakademie Düsseldorf.

From 1908 to 1924, he served as Director of the Kunstakademie. His tastes and approach to governing were considered to be rather conservative for the time. Despite this, he was constantly making additions to the curriculum; including workshops for church art and stained glass. 

He also oversaw the construction of new studio buildings for the Kunstakademie, along the Rhine, designed to be an "art city on the English model". These were demolished in 1937 to make room for the Reichsausstellung Schaffendes Volk (now the ). 

A street that runs alongside the Kunstakademie has been named after him. His older brother, was also an instructor there.

References

Further reading 
 Allgemeines Künstlerlexikon. Bio-bibliographischer Index A–Z. K. G. Saur Verlag, München 1999/2000, Band 8, S. 464
 Friedrich Schaarschmidt: Zur Geschichte der Düsseldorfer Kunst; insbesondere im XIX. Jahrhundert. Kunstverein für die Rheinlande und Westfalen, Düsseldorf 1902  (Online)

External links 

 Kölner Humor im Malkasten. Digitalisierte Ausgabe
 Erica. Digitalisierte Ausgabe
 Fritz Roeber, Data sheet @ the Rijksbureau voor Kunsthistorische Documentatie

1851 births
1924 deaths
Artists from Wuppertal
German history painters
Academic staff of Kunstakademie Düsseldorf
People from Elberfeld